This glossary of woodworking lists a number of specialized terms and concepts used in woodworking, carpentry, and related disciplines.

A

B

C

D

E

F

G

H

I

J

K

L

M

N

P

Q

R

S

T

U

V

W

References

External links
 Woodworking glossary

Woodworking
 
Woodworking
Woodworking
Wikipedia glossaries using description lists